Wasiu Taiwo (born 1 October 1976 in Lagos) is a Nigerian retired footballer who last played for Shooting Stars S.C.

Club career
Taiwo played football in the Netherlands for 10 years and after that he played in Austria for one year. He began his career at Shooting Stars F.C. In the summer of 2008 he moved from Austria to Shooting Stars S.C. where he was reunited with his former teammate Edith Agoye.

International career
Taiwo made several appearances for the Nigeria national football team. He scored on his debut, a US Cup match against the United States in 1995.

References

External links 

Profile at Voetbal International

1976 births
Living people
Sportspeople from Lagos
Nigerian footballers
Association football forwards
Nigeria international footballers
Nigerian expatriate footballers
Shooting Stars S.C. players
Eredivisie players
Eerste Divisie players
De Graafschap players
MVV Maastricht players
AGOVV Apeldoorn players
Fortuna Sittard players
Expatriate footballers in the Netherlands
Expatriate footballers in Austria